Denmark competed at the 1948 Summer Olympics in London, England. 162 competitors, 144 men and 18 women, took part in 83 events in 17 sports.

Medalists

Athletics

Men
Track & road events

Field events

Women
Track & road events

Field events

Boxing

Men

Canoeing

Sprint
Men

Women

Cycling

Eleven cyclists, all men, represented Denmark in 1948.
Road

Track
1000m time trial

Men's Sprint

Men's Tandem

Pursuit

Diving

Men

Women

Equestrian

Eventing

Show jumping

Fencing

15 fencers, 12 men and 3 women, represented Denmark in 1948.

Men's foil
 Ivan Ruben
 Aage Leidersdorff
 Ole Albrechtsen

Men's team foil
 Ivan Ruben, Ole Albrechtsen, Aage Leidersdorff, Tage Jørgensen, Ivan Osiier, Flemming Vögg

Men's épée
 Mogens Lüchow
 Ib Nielsen

Men's team épée
 Mogens Lüchow, Erik Andersen, Ib Nielsen, René Dybkær, Jakob Lyng, Kenneth Flindt

Men's sabre
 Aage Leidersdorff
 Ivan Ruben
 Ivan Osiier

Women's foil
 Karen Lachmann
 Grete Olsen
 Kate Mahaut

Field hockey

Group stage
The first of each group and also the second of Group C qualified for the Semi-finals.

Group C

Football

First round

Quarter-final

Semi-final

Bronze medal match

Gymnastics

Rowing

Denmark had 25 male rowers participate in six out of seven rowing events in 1948.

Men

Sailing

Open

Shooting

Seven shooters represented Denmark in 1948.
Men

Swimming

Women

Weightlifting

Men

Wrestling

Men's Greco-Roman

Art competitions

References

External links
Official Olympic Reports
International Olympic Committee results database

Nations at the 1948 Summer Olympics
1948
Summer Olympics